Regina is an unincorporated community in Jefferson County, in the U.S. state of Missouri.

History
A post office called Regina was established in 1881, and remained in operation until 1905. Regina was the first name of a woman in the neighborhood.

References

Unincorporated communities in Jefferson County, Missouri
Unincorporated communities in Missouri